Asianet Satellite Communications Private Limited, is an Indian multi system operator (MSO). It is the largest cable network services company in Kerala since its inception in 1993. It is a market leader in South India, it is ranked among the top 20 ISP's in India by TRAI. It is also one of the fastest growing ISPs in India. Asianet Satellite Communications have no connections to Asianet, Asianet Plus, Asianet Movies.

Asianet Broadband

Asianet Broadband, a division of Asianet Satellite Communications Pvt. Ltd. is an Internet service provider. It has set up its own International Satellite Gateways at Thiruvananthapuram and Kochi. It is also one of the earliest Cable ISP services that have presence in Kerala. Asianet Digital Network Pvt. Ltd., a wholly owned subsidiary of Asianet Satellite Communications Pvt. Ltd. is a Digital TV networks in India. Asianet Digital Network expanded its services to Andhra Pradesh, Karnataka, Madhya Pradesh, Maharashtra, Tamil Nadu and Telangana.
Asianet Broadband have no connections to Asianet, Asianet Plus, Asianet Movies owned by Disney Star.

History 
In 2019, they launched a cable TV setup box powered by Android TV.

In December 2021, they have filed for a  million IPO in India.

References

External links

Cable television companies of India
Companies based in Thiruvananthapuram
Telecommunications companies established in 1993
Indian companies established in 1993
1993 establishments in Kerala